The Leyland Lynx was a stepped-entrance single-decker bus manufactured by Leyland in Workington, England between 1986 and 1992. After the takeover by Volvo, it was succeeded by the Volvo B10B.

Background

The Leyland Lynx (B60) was designed in 1984 as a replacement for the ageing Leyland National, being unveiled at the 1985 International Bus & Coach Exhibition at the Earls Court Exhibition Centre. Although the B60 was the first bus to carry the Lynx brand, Leyland had previously used it on truck chassis between 1936 and 1940, and again between 1968 and 1979. The Lynx name has since been revived by Ashok Leyland for use on a midibus.

History
Production vehicles began to enter service in 1986, the majority were bodied by Leyland at its Workington factory where the underframe was produced. All have a step entrance, Leyland offered the option of a floor with a step in the middle or one that gently ramped from aft of the front platform to the rear. A plan for offering this bus with a single-piece flat windscreen was considered, but was not carried out. A common feature, therefore, is that the Lynx has two separate windscreens and has the driver's windscreen raked back, resembling 1950s single-decker buses and the Wright Handybus.

Engines offered were the Leyland TL11, Gardner 6HLXCT and Cummins L10, while the Lynx II was also available with the Volvo THD102KF.

In 1990, the updated Lynx Mark II version was introduced. It could be recognised easily by its protruding front dash/grille panel, whilst the original design was flat. Additionally, a select few of the 140 vehicles produced featured Volvo engines, which drastically reduced performance in pursuit of more environmentally friendly engines.

The Mark II was also available as a bus underframe for other coachbuilders to body. Although the large majority of Lynxes carried the Leyland body, seven chassis were bodied by Alexander with N-type bodywork for Citybus (Belfast), including the first prototype. Northern Counties also catalogued bodies for the Lynx but none were built. 

The type saw service all over the United Kingdom, with the largest fleet owned by West Midlands Travel. A total of 258 were purchased, including six demonstrators, delivered early in 1986 equipped with Gardner engines and semi-automatic Leyland Hydracyclic gearboxes (which were later converted to ZF automatic). They were gradually withdrawn from 2000 onwards, with the last three withdrawn from passenger service in March 2009, although 10 remained in the driver training fleet until March 2010.

Another significant operator of Leyland Lynxes were Caldaire Group companies West Riding and Yorkshire Woollen. The companies purchased 129 Mk1 and Mk2 Lynxes new or second-hand until late 1991, replacing former National Bus Company vehicles as part of a yearly fleet replacement programme. Other Caldaire Group operators who purchased Leyland Lynxes included Tees & District and United Automobile Services, while elsewhere in the North East of England, Cleveland Transit, Busways Travel Services and Go-Ahead Northern also took delivery of Lynxes.

Other operators of Leyland Lynxes included municipally-owned operators Lothian Regional Transport, who in 1991, took delivery of twelve Lynxes uniquely built with dual doors, Isle of Man Transport, who took delivery of two Lynxes in 1989, and Nottingham City Transport. Lynxes were also ordered by former municipals and National Bus Company subsidiaries such as Brighton Transport, Boro'line Maidstone and Merthyr Tydfil Transport. The AJS Group also purchased Lynxes for its Harrogate & District and Keighley & District operations.

The last two Lynxes to roll off the production line entered service with Halton Transport in August 1992. The Lynx was the core of Halton Transport's fleet for over 10 years; the company was the first municipal operator to order Lynxes and took delivery of the first Mk2 Lynx in 1990, with the operator owning a total of 36 Lynxes at the end of production. In later life at Halton, they were used on a number of school contracts and the occasional regular service. In October 2010, all of Halton's remaining Lynxes were sold, the last Lynx produced going into preservation, with the penultimate Lynx used to donate spares.

Following the takeover of Leyland by Volvo in March 1988, the Lynx was superseded by the Volvo B10B in 1992. Total production of Lynxes was approximately 1,060 vehicles, including six prototypes (one of which was not bodied) and several development vehicles. About 140 of the total were Lynx Mark IIs.

Exports
A small number of Lynxes were exported as demonstrators, but no sales ever resulted.

In 1984, a framed chassis was sent to Australia. After being completed by JW Bolton in Perth, it operated for Transperth, ACTION and Hornibrook Bus Lines before being sold to Lever Coachlines in 1987. In 1989, two were bodied by Pressed Metal Corporation as demonstrators for the State Transit Authority, but the trial never occurred and they were sold to John J Hill, Wollongong.

In 1988, Singapore Bus Service took delivery of an Walter Alexander bodied Leyland Lynx. Originally serving feeder bus routes in Ang Mo Kio, it eventually ended up on employee bus services between Ang Mo Kio Bus Depot and Yishun. It was involved in an accident in August 2001 and had its original Lynx-style front replaced with an Alexander PS type style. It was eventually withdrawn and scrapped in 2005. Conversely one Leyland Tiger received a Lynx-style Leyland body for export to New Zealand, initially being operated by Newmans Coach Lines and later Go Bus Transport.

In 1990, three of the order being built for West Midlands Travel were sent to Australia as demonstrators. Two operated with ACTION, while the third was demonstrated to the State Transport Authority and State Transit Authority, before all three were sold to Southtrans.

Preservation
Several Lynxes have now entered preservation, with some requiring extensive rebuilding to bring them back to original condition, due to body corrosion, as well as reversing modifications made by operators during their history. One such example is the removal of all of the patterned body skirts, combined with the replacement of the square wheel arches with non-patterned round ones. Both of these modifications were made to make it easier to replace such parts in the event of an accident.

In Australia, the JW Bolton bodied demonstrator has been preserved by the Sydney Bus Museum.

References

External links

Lynx
Bus chassis
Single-deck buses
Step-entrance buses
Vehicles introduced in 1986